Susanne is a 1961 Swedish film directed by Elsa Colfach.

References

External links

1961 films
Swedish drama films
1960s Swedish films